Dame Dorothy Tutin,  (8 April 19306 August 2001) was an English actress of stage, film and television. For her work in the theatre, she won two Olivier Awards and two Evening Standard Awards for Best Actress. She was made a CBE in 1967 and a Dame (DBE) in 2000.

Tutin began her stage career in 1949 and won the 1960 Best Actress Evening Standard Award for Twelfth Night. Having made her Broadway debut in the 1963 production of The Hollow Crown, she received a Tony Award nomination for her role in the 1968 original Broadway production of Portrait of a Queen. In the 1970s, she won a second Best Actress Evening Standard Award and won the Olivier Award (then the Society of London awards) for Best Actress in a Revival for A Month in the Country and The Double Dealer. Her films included The Importance of Being Earnest (1952), The Beggar's Opera (1953), A Tale of Two Cities (1958), Savage Messiah (1972) and The Shooting Party (1985).

An obituary in The Daily Telegraph described her as "one of the most enchanting, accomplished and intelligent leading ladies on the post-war British stage. With her husky voice, deep brown eyes, wistful smile and sense of humour, she brought an enduring charm to all kinds of stage drama, ancient and modern, as well as to films and television plays in a career that spanned more than 40 years".

Biography
Dorothy Tutin was born in London on 8 April 1930, the daughter of John Tutin and Adie Evelyn Fryers, a Yorkshire couple who married the following year.

She was educated at St Catherine's School, Bramley, Surrey and studied for the stage at PARADA and the Royal Academy of Dramatic Art. Tutin was also a talented pianist.

In 1963 she married the actor Derek Waring, and they had two children, Nicholas (born 1966) and Amanda, both of whom became actors (mother and daughter appeared together in the 1989 All Creatures Great and Small episode "Mending Fences"). Dorothy Tutin and Derek Waring remained married until her death in 2001 at the age of 71 from leukaemia. Waring died in 2007, also from cancer.

Career

Theatre
Dorothy Tutin made her first stage appearance at the Boltons on 6 September 1949, playing Princess Margaret of England in William Douglas-Home's play The Thistle and the Rose.

She joined the Bristol Old Vic Company in January 1950, appearing as Phebe in As You Like It, Anni in Denis Cannan's Captain Carvallo and Belinda in John Vanbrugh's The Provok'd Wife. She joined the Old Vic company in London for the 1950–51 season, playing Win-the-Fight Littlewit in Ben Jonson's Bartholomew Fair, Ann Page in The Merry Wives of Windsor and Princess Katharine in Henry V.

At the Lyric Theatre in September 1951, she played Martina in Christopher Fry's Thor with Angels, followed in January 1952 by Hero in John Gielgud's production of Much Ado About Nothing at the Phoenix Theatre.

Subsequent roles included:

Rose Pemberton in The Living Room (Graham Greene), Wyndham's Theatre, April 1953
Sally Bowles in I Am a Camera (John Van Druten), New Theatre, March 1954
Joan in The Lark (Jean Anouilh), Lyric Hammersmith, March 1955
Hedvig in The Wild Duck, Saville Theatre, December 1955
Caroline Traherne in The Gates of Summer, touring, September 1956
Jean Rice in The Entertainer, Royal Court, April 1957

Work with the RSC
Tutin first joined the Shakespeare Memorial Theatre Company for the 1958 season in Stratford-upon-Avon, appearing as Juliet in Romeo and Juliet, Viola in Twelfth Night and Ophelia in Hamlet. With the same company (but renamed the Royal Shakespeare Company from January 1961), she appeared as:

Viola in Twelfth Night, Aldwych Theatre, December 1960 (Evening Standard Awards Best Actress)
Sister Jeanne in The Devils, Aldwych, February 1961.
Juliet in Romeo and Juliet, Royal Shakespeare Theatre, Stratford, August 1961
Desdemona in Othello, Stratford October 1961, Aldwych, October 1962
Varya in The Cherry Orchard, Aldwych, December 1961 and October 1962
Polly Peachum in The Beggar's Opera, Aldwych, July 1963

Other work included:
Beatrice in Beatrice et Benedict (concert version) Royal Festival Hall, November 1963
Queen Victoria in Portrait of a Queen, Bristol Old Vic March 1965; Vaudeville Theatre, May 1965; and Henry Miller NY, February 1968 (Tony nominee)
Rosalind in As You Like It, RSC Stratford and Aldwych, summer 1967, then at the Ahmanson Theatre, Los Angeles, January 1968
Ann in Ann Veronica, Belgrade Theatre, Coventry, February 1969
Francine in Play on Love, St Martin's Theatre, January 1970
Alice in Arden of Faversham, RSC Theatregoround Festival, Roundhouse, November 1970
Kate in Old Times, Aldwych, June 1971
Title role in Peter Pan, London Coliseum, December 1971 and 1972
Maggie Wylie in What Every Woman Knows, touring, March 1972 and Albery Theatre, November 1974
Natalya Petrovna in A Month in the Country, Chichester Festival Theatre, 1974 season; and (for Prospect Productions) Albery Theatre, November 1975 (Evening Standard Awards Best Actress) & (Olivier Award for Best Actress in a Revival)
Lady Macbeth in Macbeth, Yvonne Arnaud Theatre, October 1976
Cleopatra in Antony and Cleopatra, Edinburgh Festival 1977 and Old Vic November 1977
Madame Ranevsky in The Cherry Orchard, National Theatre, Olivier, February 1978
Lady Macbeth in Macbeth, National, Olivier, June 1978
Lady Plyant in The Double Dealer, National, Olivier, September 1978 (Olivier Award for Best Actress in a Revival)
Genia Hofreiter in Undiscovered Country, National, Olivier, June 1979
Madame Dubarry in Reflections, Theatre Royal Haymarket, March 1980
Hester Collyer in The Deep Blue Sea, Greenwich Theatre September 1981
 Sarah in After the Lions by Ronald Harwood. World premiere directed by Michael Elliott at the Royal Exchange, Manchester 1982
Deborah in A Kind of Alaska (part of a Pinter Other Places triple-bill), Duchess Theatre, March 1985
Blanche Jerome in Brighton Beach Memoirs, Aldwych Theatre, December 1986
Sonia in Loleh Bellon's Thursday's Ladies, Apollo Theatre, September 1987
Edna Selby in Harlequinade and Millie Crocker-Harris in The Browning Version, Royalty Theatre, March 1988
Desiree Armfeldt in A Little Night Music, Minerva Theatre, Chichester, August 1989; Piccadilly Theatre, October 1989
Elderly Woman in Mountain Language and Melissa in Party Time (Harold Pinter), Almeida Theatre, November 1991
Rhoda Monkhams in Rodney Ackland's After October, Minerva, Chichester, May 1997, Richmond Theatre and Greenwich Theatre, June 1997, co-starring with Nicholas Waring
Fonsia Dorsey in The Gin Game, Savoy Theatre, March 1999, co-starring with Joss Ackland

Films and television
Tutin won the role of Cecily in Anthony Asquith's film version of Oscar Wilde's The Importance of Being Earnest (1952), for which she received a BAFTA nomination for Most Promising Newcomer). She then played Polly Peachum to Laurence Olivier's Macheath in Peter Brook's film version of The Beggar's Opera (1953).

Her next major film role was as Lucie in the film A Tale of Two Cities (1958), opposite Dirk Bogarde.

She continued to divide her appearances among stage, TV and film, appearing in the title role of a television production of Jean Anouilh's Antigone (1959) and the film Cromwell (1970) as Queen Henrietta Maria, and then played Anne Boleyn in the BBC's series The Six Wives of Henry VIII (also 1970), which starred Keith Michell in the title role. She also played Margot Asquith, the wife of Prime Minister H.H. Asquith, in the dramatic series Number 10 (1983). She appeared in the Ken Russell film Savage Messiah (1972), and was a panellist over many years (at least from 1967 to 1983) on Face the Music.

She also performed as the teacher Sarah Burton in the TV series South Riding (1974), based on the novel South Riding by Winifred Holtby. She starred as Mrs. Alving in Yorkshire Television production of Ibsen's Ghosts  (1977). In the early 1980s, Tutin also appeared in the made-for-television film Murder with Mirrors (1985, based on an Agatha Christie novel) along with Helen Hayes and Bette Davis. Another of her notable roles was as Goneril in an Emmy-winning television production of Shakespeare's King Lear (1983), opposite Laurence Olivier as King Lear. She guest starred in an episode of the 1980s TV-series Robin of Sherwood as Lady Margaret of Gisbourne.

Awards and nominations

Honours
Tutin was created a Commander of the Order of the British Empire (CBE) by The Queen in 1967, and raised to Dame Commander (DBE) in 2000.

Filmography

References
Notes

Sources
Who's Who in the Theatre 17th edition, Gale (1981). .
Theatre Record and its annual Indexes.

External links

Obituary: The Independent
Obituary: The Daily Telegraph

1930 births
2001 deaths
Alumni of RADA
English film actresses
English television actresses
English stage actresses
Dames Commander of the Order of the British Empire
Actresses awarded damehoods
Deaths from leukemia
Actresses from London
Royal Shakespeare Company members
Deaths from cancer in England
People educated at St Catherine's School, Bramley
Laurence Olivier Award winners